Municipality of Struga is a municipality in western North Macedonia. Struga is also the name of the town where the municipal seat is found. Struga Municipality is part of the Southwestern Statistical Region.

Geography
The municipality borders
Lake Ohrid to the south,
Debarca Municipality to the east,
Centar Župa Municipality to the north, and
Vevčani Municipality and Albania to the west.

Inhabited places 
The only town in the municipality is Struga.

Besides Struga, there are additional 50 villages:
Bezovo, Bidževo, Bogojci, Brčevo, Burinec,
Delogoždi, Draslajca, Dolna Belica, Dolno Tateši, Dobovjani, Drenok,
Džepin,
Frangovo,
Globočica, Gorna Belica, Gorno Tateši,
Jablanica,
Kališta, Korošišta,
Labuništa, Lakaica, Livada, Lokov, Ložani, Lukovo,
Mali Vlaj, Misleševo, Mislodežda, Modrič, Moroišta,
Nerezi, Novo Selo,
Oktisi,
Piskupština, Podgorci, Poum, Prisovjani,
Radolišta, Radožda, Ržanovo,
Selci,
Šum,
Tašmaruništa, Toska,
Velešta, Višni, Vraništa,
Zagračani and Zbaždi.

Demographics

Prior to 2004 adjustment
After 2004 the municipalities of Delogoždi, Labuništa, Lukova and Velešta merged with Struga Municipality and the demographics changed. Before that, the demographics of the municipality was:

Ethnic groups. 

Languages

Religion

Post-2004
Mother tongues according to the 2002 and 2021 censuses.

According to the last national census from 2021 this municipality has 50,980 inhabitants. Ethnic groups in the municipality include:

According to the 2002 census, the religions practiced the municipality are:

The ethnic composition and numbers of most communities in the Struga region have remained static apart from the Macedonian Muslim (Torbeš) population who mostly self-declare themselves as either Albanians or Turks. Macedonian Muslims are located in the religiously mixed villages of Boroec, Jablanica, Labuništa, Oktisi and Podgorci, where they live alongside Orthodox Macedonians. Amidst the Albanian population of Zagračani are a few Macedonian Muslim families originating from Oktisi and Podgorci who now speak Albanian.

The Struga area is home to various dialects spoken by Macedonians, such as the Vevčani-Radožda dialect. The Macedonian language is a second language for most of the non-Slavic ethnic groups in the Struga region. Some communities are bilingual and other ethnic groups are trilingual due to their religious (Islamic) heritage. Many Albanians have a good working knowledge of the variety of Turkish spoken in the Struga area and it serves as a third language for them. Local Macedonians rarely have knowledge of languages spoken by other ethnic groups living in the Struga area. Aromanians traditionally used to live in two villages of the Struga region, the now abandoned settlement of Gorna Belica alongside Albanians that spoke the Tosk Albanian dialect, and Dolna Belica, which has become repopulated mainly with Albanians. Aromanian speaking Muslims also existed in Dolna Belica, although they have assimilated into Albanian identity and language. Some Aromanians from Gorna Belica have resettled in the nearby village of Vevčani. The village of Mali Vlaj was also once inhabited by Aromanians, belonging to the Frashëriot subgroup that originated from Albania and became assimilated during the course of the 19th century.

Both main dialects Gheg and Tosk of Albanian are spoken in the Struga region and are mostly separated along the course of the Black Drim river that runs through the middle of Struga town. The Tosk Albanian dialect is spoken in Frangovo, Kališta,  Radolišta, Šum and Zagračani, while all other Albanian inhabited villages of the Struga region speak the Gheg Albanian dialect. Part of the village population in Labuništa is Albanian. Until the last few decades of the 20th century Tosk Albanian, in particular the geographically central variety of the dialect dominated among speakers of Albanian in Struga. The local Romani population of Struga speaks and sings in the southern Tosk Albanian dialect, as does the local Turkish population. Aromanians in Struga and the wider area have practical knowledge of Tosk Albanian as a third language. Local Macedonians who learn Albanian, speak the Tosk Albanian dialect.

History 

On 26 November 2019, an earthquake struck Albania and Struga Municipality held 1 day of mourning for the earthquake victims and sent 1,000,000 denars for relief efforts.

References

External links

 Official website
 Struga Tourism Portal

 
Southwestern Statistical Region
Municipalities of North Macedonia